Adolph Leonard Reed Jr. (born January 14, 1947) is an American professor emeritus of political science at the University of Pennsylvania, specializing in studies of issues of racism and U.S. politics. 

He has taught at Yale, Northwestern, and the New School for Social Research and he has written on racial and economic inequality. He is a contributing editor to The New Republic and has been a frequent contributor to The Progressive, The Nation, and other left-wing publications. He is a founding member of the U.S. Labor Party.

Biography
Born in the Bronx, New York, Reed was raised in New Orleans, Louisiana. In the late 1960s, he organized protests involving poor black people and antiwar soldiers.

He received his B.A from the University of North Carolina at Chapel Hill in 1971 and his Ph.D. from Atlanta University in 1981. During his doctoral studies, he worked as an advisor to Maynard Jackson, Atlanta’s first black mayor.

He helped found the U.S. Labor Party in the 1990s.

Views
Reed's work on U.S. politics is notable for its critique of identity politics and anti-racism, particularly of their role in black politics.
Reed has been a vocal critic of the policies and ideology of black Democratic politicians. For instance, he has often criticized the politics of Barack Obama, both before and during his presidency.

In an article in The Village Voice published on January 16, 1996, Reed said of Obama:
In Chicago, for instance, we’ve gotten a foretaste of the new breed of foundation-hatched black communitarian voices; one of them, a smooth Harvard lawyer with impeccable do-good credentials and vacuous-to-repressive neoliberal politics, has won a state senate seat on a base mainly in the liberal foundation and development worlds. His fundamentally bootstrap line was softened by a patina of the rhetoric of authentic community, talk about meeting in kitchens, small-scale solutions to social problems, and the predictable elevation of process over program — the point where identity politics converges with old-fashioned middle-class reform in favoring form over substance. I suspect that his ilk is the wave of the future in U.S. black politics, as in Haiti and wherever else the International Monetary Fund has sway. So far the black activist response hasn’t been up to the challenge. We have to do better.

After South Carolina Governor Nikki Haley announced that African American Republican Tim Scott would be named to the soon-to-be-open U.S. Senate seat in South Carolina, held by Jim DeMint on December 17, 2012, Reed, in an op-ed published in the December 18, 2012 edition of The New York Times, stated: "It obscures the fact that modern black Republicans have been more tokens than signs of progress." Reed's editorial has been criticized by conservatives who argue that Reed applies the term "token" to any African American who holds conservative views and posited a correlation between Reed's conviction that GOP policies do not reflect mainstream black politics to a belief that the tokenism charge does not apply when the African-American politician is a member of the Democratic Party.

Reed supported Bernie Sanders in the 2016 and 2020 presidential campaigns.

Personal life 
Reed is Catholic.

Publications

Selected articles 
 "The Myth of Class Reductionism". The New Republic (September 25, 2019)
 "Antiracism: a neoliberal alternative to a left". Dialectical Anthropology 42.2 (June 2018)
 "The Kerner Commission and the Irony of Antiracist Politics". Labor: Studies in Working-Class History of the Americas 14.4 (December 2017) 
 "The Post-1965 Trajectory of Race, Class, and Urban Politics in the United States Reconsidered". Labor Studies Journal 41.3 (2016)
 "The Black-Labor-Left Alliance in the Neoliberal Age". New Labor Forum 25.2 (2016)
 "No Easy Solutions". Jacobin (2016)
 "Doubling Down in Atlantic City". Jacobin (2016)
 "Bernie Sanders and the New Class Politics". Jacobin (2016)
 "From Jenner to Dolezal: One Trans Good, the Other Not So Much". Common Dreams (Monday, June 15, 2015)
 "The James Brown Theory of Black Liberation." Jacobin. (2015)
 "The Strange Career of the Voting Rights Act: Selma in Fact and Fiction". New Labor Forum 24.2 (2015)
 "The Crisis of Labour and the Left in the United States'". (w/Mark Dudzic). Socialist Register. 51 (2014).
 "Michelle Goldberg Goes to Washington". Jacobin (2014)
 "Nothing Left: The Long, Slow Surrender of American Liberals". Harpers (March 2014)
 "Adolph Reed, Jr. Responds". New Labor Forum 23.1 (2013)
 "Marx, Race, and Neoliberalism". New Labor Forum 22.1 (2013)
 "Race, Class, Crisis: The Discourse of Racial Disparity and its Analytical Discontents". (w/Merlin Chowkwanyun)Socialist Register 48 (2012)
 "Why Labor's Soldiering for the Democrats is a Losing Battle". New Labor Forum 19.3, (Fall 2010)
 "The 2004 Election in Perspective: The Myth of 'Cultural Divide' and the Triumph of Neoliberal Ideology". American Quarterly 57.1 (2005) 
 "Reinventing the Working Class: A Study in Elite Image Manipulation". New Labor Forum 13.3 (Fall 2004)
 "Race and the Disruption of the New Deal Coalition". Urban Affairs Quarterly 27.2 (1991)
 "W.E.B. Dubois: A Perspective on the Bases of his Political Thought". Political Theory 13.3 (1985)
 "Pan-Africanism: Ideology for Liberation?". The Black Scholar 3 (September 1971)

Books and chapters
 The South: Jim Crow and Its Afterlives. Verso Books (2022),  
 "Foreword" in Crashing the Party: From the Bernie Sanders Campaign to a Progressive Movement. (author) Heather Gautney. Verso Books (2018),  
 Renewing Black Intellectual History: The Ideological and Material Foundations of African American Thought (editor w/ Kenneth W. Warren). Routledge (2010), 
 "The study of black politics and the practice of black politics: their historical relation and evolution" in Problems and Methods in the Study of Politics edited by Ian Shapiro, Rogers M. Smith, and Tarek E. Masoud. Cambridge University Press (2009), 
 "Class Inequality, Liberal Bad Faith, and Neoliberalism: The True Disaster of Katrina" in Capitalizing on Catastrophe: Neoliberal Strategies in Disaster Reconstruction Edited by Nandini Gunewardena and Mark Schuller. AltaMira Press (2008), 
 "Introduction," "Class-ifying the Hurricane" in Unnatural Disaster: The Nation on Hurricane Katrina. Editor Betsy Reed. Nation Books. (2006), 
 "Why Is There No Black Political Movement?" in Cultural Resistance Reader by Stephen Duncombe. Verso (2002),  
 Without Justice for All: The New Liberalism and Our Retreat from Racial Equality. Routledge (2001), 
 Class Notes: Posing as Politics and Other Thoughts on the American Scene. The New Press (2000), 
 Stirrings in the Jug: Black Politics in the Post-Segregation Era. University of Minnesota Press (1999), 
 W.E.B. Du Bois and American Political Thought: Fabianism and the Color Line (1997), 
 "Demobilization in the New Black Political Regime: Ideological Capitulation and Radical Failure in the Postsegregation Era" in The Bubbling Cauldron: Race, Ethnicity, and the Urban Crisis edited by Michael Smith and Joe Feagin. University of Minnesota Press (1995), 
 "The Allure of Malcolm X and the Changing Character of Black Politics" in Malcolm X: In Our Own Image edited by Joe Wood. St. Martin's Press (1992),  Reprinted in Stirrings in the Jug: Black Politics in the Post-Segregation Era.
 The Jesse Jackson Phenomenon: The Crisis of Purpose in Afro-American Politics (1986), 
 "Pan-Africanism as Black Liberalism: Du Bois and Garvey" in Pan-Africanism: New Directions in Strategy edited by Ofuatey-Kodjoe. University Press of America (1986)
 Race, Politics, and Culture: Critical Essays on the Radicalism of the 1960s (editor) (1986), 
 “Black Particularity Reconsidered”. Telos 39 (Spring 1979). New York: Telos Press. Reprinted in Is It Nation Time?: Contemporary Essays on Black Power and Black Nationalism Editor Eddie S. Glaude Jr. University of Chicago Press. (2002),

References

External links
 Articles by Reed in The Nation
 Article by Reed in The Progressive
 Reed at University of Pennsylvania's Political Science Department
 Race, Class and Crisis video presentation by Adolph Reed, recorded September 24, 2010
 Obama, Antiracism, and Rebuilding the American Left video presentation by Adolph Reed, recorded March 9, 2015
 Three Tremés, on David Simon's Treme
 Reed is interviewed by Bill Moyers on February 25, 2014 in which his article, The Surrender of American Liberals, published in the March 2014 edition of Harper's Magazine is discussed, along with other topics

1947 births
Living people
African-American academics
African-American non-fiction writers
American Marxists
University of Pennsylvania faculty
American non-fiction writers
American political party founders
American political scientists
Critics of postmodernism
Northwestern University faculty
Tulane University alumni
University of North Carolina alumni
Yale University faculty
American male non-fiction writers
African-American Catholics